Bernard Grosse Broermann (born 1943/44) is a German billionaire, the founder of Asklepios Kliniken, one of Germany's three largest operators of private hospitals. It employs more than 45,000 people, and owns 150 hospitals worldwide.

Early life 
Bernard gr. Broermann grew up in Damme and studied medicine and chemistry in Berlin and Münster up to the respective preliminary examinations. He then switched to studying law andbusiness administration and graduated with both legal state examinations and admission to the bar. He was awarded a doctorate in law in 1970 with his dissertation ‘The Scope ofInvestment Legislation’. During his studies, he founded the company, "Capital Treuhand", which was responsible for managing SEC-controlled funds. After completing his studies in Berlin, he sold this company. Broermann has an MBA from the INSEAD and Harvard University.

Career 
Before founding the organisation Asklepios, and his first hospital in 1984, Broermann worked as an accountant and lawyer before founding Asklepios and his first hospital in 1984.

Asklepios Kliniken has moved into luxury hotels with it subsidiary, Dr. Broermann Hotels & Residences GmbH, which has bought Hotel Atlantic Kempinski in Hamburg, the Kempinski Hotel Falkenstein in Königstein, a luxury hotel and spa in the Taunus region near Frankfurt, and the Villa Rothschild Kempinski near Frankfurt. In the 2018 fiscal year, the Asklepios Group achieved an operating result (EBITDA) of €397.6 million with an annualrevenue of more than €3.4 billion, earnings after tax (EAT) amounted to €171.1 million; the number of full-time employees was 35,327 at the 2018 balance sheet date.

As of November 2015, October 2020 estimated his net worth at US$3.5 billion.

Personal life 
Broermann is married with three children and lives in Königstein, Germany.

References 

1943 births
Living people
German businesspeople in the healthcare industry
German billionaires
Harvard Business School alumni
INSEAD alumni
20th-century German businesspeople
21st-century German businesspeople